Paris Université Club, also known as Paris UC and PUC, is a French multi-sport club that was founded on 1 May 1906. The club is located in the 13th arrondissement of Paris.

Sports 
The club offers the following sports, among others:
 Baseball : Paris Université Club (baseball)
 Rugby union : Paris Université Club (rugby union)
 Volleyball : Paris Volley
 Athletics
 Badminton
 Basketball : Paris Université Club (basketball)
 Fencing
 Floorball
 Football
 Handball
 Judo
 Parachuting
 Roller skating
 Skiing
 Tennis

References

External links
 Official site

Multi-sport clubs in France
Division Élite teams
Sports clubs in Paris